The 2011–12 Rugby-Bundesliga was the 41st edition of this competition and the 92nd edition of the German rugby union championship. In the Rugby-Bundesliga, the first division, ten teams played a home-and-away season with semi-finals and a final between the top four teams at the end. The season started on 27 August 2010 and finished with the championship final on 5 May 2012, interrupted by a winter break from mid-December to late February. The league's top try scorer was Caine Elisara for the second year running while Luke James Muggeridge took out the honours of best points scorer for the first time. Both are from New Zealand and played for Heidelberger RK.

The league was won by Heidelberger RK who defeated TV Pforzheim 20-16 to earn its third consecutive title. TV Pforzheim played in its first-ever German championship final, having defeated SC 1880 Frankfurt 46–25 in the semi-finals. Frankfurt had played in the previous five finals and won the championship in 2008 and 2009. The second semi-final was played between HRK and SC Neuenheim with the former winning 71–21.

In the second tier, the 2nd Rugby-Bundesliga, FC St. Pauli Rugby and the reserve team of SC 1880 Frankfurt took out the division titles, with SC 1880 Frankfurt II taking out the overall title with a 32–22 finals victory.

Both divisions of the 2nd Bundesliga played with only nine instead of ten clubs. The South/West division lost RG Heidelberg II just before the start of the season when the club decided to withdraw its reserve team to the third division while the reserve team of Berliner Rugby Club was withdrawn during the season. RU Hohen Neuendorf was expulsed from the league during the season for falling to field in two games without adequate excuse. TSV Handschuhsheim II was punished the same way for the same reason after the season had ended, with both of the teams being relegated.

In mid-July 2012 the Deutsche Rugby Tag, the annual general meeting of the DRV decided to approve a league reform proposed by German international Manuel Wilhelm. The new system will see the number of clubs in the Bundesliga increased from ten to 24 in 2012–13, the league divided into four regional divisions of six clubs each and the finals series expanded from four to eight teams. One of the main aims of the reform was to reduce the number of kilometres traveled by individual teams and therefore reduce the travel expenses. Additionally, the 2nd Bundesliga will also expanded to 24 teams.

Bundesliga table
The final standings in the table:

TV Pforzheim deducted 2 points.
Relegated: None, league expanded to 22 teams in 2012-13
Promoted from the 2nd Bundesliga South/West: Heidelberger TV, RC Luxembourg, ASV Köln Rugby, RC Mainz, RC Aachen
Promoted from the 2nd Bundesliga North/East: FC St. Pauli Rugby, SC Germania List, TSV Victoria Linden, Hamburger RC, Berliner SV 92, USV Potsdam Rugby (DRC Hannover withdrew before the first round due to a lack of players, therefore only 22 teams in the Bundesliga in 2012–13)
Promoted from the Rugby-Regionalliga: RC Leipzig (Berlin Grizzlies withdrew before the start of the season, therefore only 22 teams in the Bundesliga in 2012–13)

Bundesliga results
The results of the Bundesliga in 2011–12:

Key

Player statistics

Try scorers
The leading try scores in the 2011–12 Rugby-Bundesliga season were (10 tries or more):

Point scorers
The leading point scores in the 2011–12 Rugby-Bundesliga season were (100 points or more):

Per club
The top try and point scorers per club were:

Semi-finals and final

Semi-finals

Final

2nd Bundesliga tables

South/West
The final standings in the table:

Promoted to Bundesliga: Heidelberger TV, RC Luxembourg, ASV Köln Rugby, RC Mainz, RC Aachen
Relegated from Bundesliga: None
Relegated from 2nd Bundesliga South/West: TSV Handschuhsheim II (demoted), Heidelberger RK II (voluntary)
Promoted to 2nd Bundesliga South/West: Division disbanded

North/East
The final standings in the table:

Promoted to Bundesliga: FC St. Pauli Rugby, SC Germania List, TSV Victoria Linden, DRC Hannover, Hamburger RC, Berliner SV 92, USV Potsdam Rugby
Relegated from Bundesliga: None
Relegated from 2nd Bundesliga North/East: RU Hohen Neuendorf (demoted), DRC Hannover (voluntary)
Promoted to 2nd Bundesliga North/East: Division disbanded

2nd Bundesliga final

References

External links
 rugbyweb.de - Rugby-Bundesliga table & results 
 Totalrugby.de - Bundesliga table & results 

2011-12
2011–12 in German rugby union
Germany
2011 in Luxembourgian sport
2012 in Luxembourgian sport